Beaucatcher Tunnel carries U.S. Route 70 (US 70) and US 74A through Beaucatcher Mountain in Asheville, North Carolina. Work on the  tunnel was started in 1927 and completed in 1929. The tunnel has two lanes and sidewalks separated from the traffic lanes by concrete barriers. It was renovated in 2014 with new stone portals.

For the construction of Interstate 240 on a parallel alignment two new tunnels were considered for the interstate route. In 1967 the North Carolina State Highway Commission endorsed an open cut through the mountain, which was projected to save $11.4 million over tunnel construction. The four-mile project was completed October 31, 1980.

References

Tunnels in North Carolina
Tunnels completed in 1929
U.S. Route 70
U.S. Route 74
Buildings and structures in Asheville, North Carolina